Kim Hyun-su (born February 14, 1973) is a South Korean former footballer who last played as a defender.

Club career
He started his club career with Chunnam Dragons.

At the end of the 2002 season, he moved to Jeonbuk Hyundai Motors. On 9 November 2008, at the halftime of last match of 2008 season, he announced his retirement. He desired to be a coach with Jeonbuk Hyundai Motors.

He was part of the South Korea national football team. He played at 1996 Summer Olympics and 1998 Asian Games.

International career

Honours

Club
 1996: Korean FA Cup winner with Chunnam Dragons
 2003: Korean FA Cup winner with Jeonbuk Hyundai Motors
 2005: Korean FA Cup winner with Jeonbuk Hyundai Motors
 2006: AFC Champions League winner with Jeonbuk Hyundai Motors

External links
 
 National Team Player Record 
 
 

1973 births
Living people
Association football defenders
South Korean footballers
South Korea international footballers
Jeonnam Dragons players
Gimcheon Sangmu FC players
Jeonbuk Hyundai Motors players
K League 1 players
Footballers at the 1996 Summer Olympics
Olympic footballers of South Korea
Footballers at the 1998 Asian Games
Asian Games competitors for South Korea